John Carruthers may refer to:

 John Carruthers (politician) (1863–1949), member of the Canadian House of Commons
 John Carruthers (engineer) (1836–1914), New Zealand engineer and economic theorist
 John Carruthers (cricketer) (born 1970), English cricketer
 John Carruthers (footballer) (1900–1959), English footballer
 John Carruthers (surveyor) (1847–1942), pioneer of South Australia
 John Valentine Carruthers (born 1958), English musician, guitarist and composer
 John Franklin Bruce Carruthers (1889–1960), American minister